Companion may refer to:

Relationships

Currently
 Any of several interpersonal relationships such as friend or acquaintance
 A domestic partner, akin to a spouse
 Sober companion, an addiction treatment coach
 Companion (caregiving), a caregiver, such as a nurse assistant, paid to give a patient one-on-one attention

Historically
 A concubine, a long-term sexual partner not accorded the status of marriage
 Lady's companion, a historic term for a genteel woman who was paid to live with a woman of rank or wealth
 Companion cavalry, the elite cavalry of Alexander the Great
 Foot Companion, the primary type of soldier in the army of Alexander the Great
 Companions of William the Conqueror, those who took part in the Norman conquest of England
 Muhammad's companions, the Sahaba, the friends who surrounded the prophet of Islam

Film and television
 Companion (Doctor Who), a character who travels with the Doctor in the TV series Doctor Who
 Companion (Firefly), a type of courtesan and entertainer in the TV series Firefly
 The Companion (film), a 2015 Cuban film
 The Companion, a South Korean film of 1984
 The Companion, a 1994 Universal Television film

Literature
 "The Companion" (fairy tale), a Norwegian fairy tale
 "The Companion" (short story), a story by Agatha Christie in her 1932 collection The Thirteen Problems
 The Companion, an 1828 literary journal published by Leigh Hunt

Music
 Companion, a 1999 album by Patricia Barber
 "Companion", a song by Nikki Lane from the 2017 album Highway Queen
 Companions (album), by Raphe Malik, 2002
 Companions (EP), by Mixtapes, 2011

Other uses
 Bearhawk Companion, an American homebuilt aircraft design, with two seats in side-by-side configuration
 Companion 21, an American sailboat design
 Companion (ship), an architectural feature of ships
 Companion animal, a pet animal kept for companionship
 Companion parrot, a pet parrot that interacts with its owner
 Companion matrix, a matrix with a specific relation to its characteristic polynomial p
 Companion planting, planting of different crops in close physical proximity
 "Companion series", a sister show in television
 Companion star, a star in a binary system
 Companion weapon, an object held in the non-sword hand while fencing
 A handbook or guide book or compendium e.g. Star Trek: Deep Space Nine Companion or The Oxford Companion to Music
 A member of a Holy Royal Arch chapter
 A rank within many state-awarded orders